The Cascumpeque Light  is a deactivated  lighthouse on the western north coast of Prince Edward Island, Canada. The station was established in 1856 and the lighthouse itself was built in 1899.

History
A petition to the General Assembly of Prince Edward Island  was presented in order to build a lighthouse at Cascumpec Harbour in 1848 followed by another in 1853. The lighthouse was built on Sandy Island, at the entrance of the harbour, and became active the following year. In October 1879 a gale damaged heavily the tower particularly at the foundation.

The area underwent to various works to fight the shore erosion and in 1899 the lighthouse was relocated toward south in a protected place. In 1901 two open towers, with enclosed lantern, replaced the lighthouse. A new light was built in October 1968, it was a skeletal tower with balcony, lantern and a central staircase covered by a wooden structure painted with white and red stripes. In 1999 the lighthouse was degraded and in 2004 the winter storms damaged the place so that the Canadian Coast Guard decided to deactivate the light and to dismantle the tower.

Keepers
Prospere Gallant 1853–1863 
William Hubbard 1864–1867 
Asa McCabe 1867–1879 
Mrs. Asa McCabe 1879–1880 
John McCabe 1880–1894 
F. J. Cahill 1894–1897 
James C. Tuplin 1897–1912 
D. Fraser 1912–1913 
William H. Mallet 1913–1944 
Justin F. Mallett 1943–1944 
Maurice Perry (1944), 
Wilfred Richard Gaudin 1944–1967

See also
 List of lighthouses in Prince Edward Island
 List of lighthouses in Canada

References

External links
Picture of Cascumpeque Light
 Aids to Navigation Canadian Coast Guard

Lighthouses completed in 1899
Lighthouses in Prince Edward Island
1899 establishments in Canada
Buildings and structures in Prince County, Prince Edward Island